Arthur Binks (10 January 1902 – 1969) was an English professional rugby league footballer who played in the 1920s and 1930s.

Background
Arthur Binks' birth was registered in Bramley district, West Riding of Yorkshire, and his death aged 67, was registered in Leeds district, West Riding of Yorkshire, England.

Playing career

International honours
Arthur Binks won a cap for England while at Wigan in 1929 against Other Nationalities.

Challenge Cup Final appearances

County Cup Final appearances
Arthur Binks played  in Wigan's 5-4 victory over Widnes in the 1928–29 Lancashire County Cup Final during the 1928–29 season at Wilderspool Stadium, Warrington on Saturday 24 November 1928.

Club career
The Leeds backline in the early 1920s was known as the Busy Bs, as it included; Jim Bacon, Arthur Binks, Billy Bowen, Joe Brittain and Harold Buck. Arthur Binks made his début for Wigan in the 5-11 defeat by Leigh at Mather Lane (adjacent to the Bridgewater Canal), Leigh on Saturday 1 October 1927, he scored his first try for Wigan in the 12-5 victory over Warrington in the 1927–28 Lancashire County Cup semi-final at Central Park, Wigan on Wednesday 2 November 1927, he scored his last try for Wigan in the 20-8 victory over Wigan Highfield at Tunstall Lane, Wigan on Saturday 18 October 1930, and he played his last match for Wigan in the 42-0 victory over Widnes at Central Park, Wigan on Saturday 21 March 1931.

References

External links

1902 births
1969 deaths
Bradford Bulls players
England national rugby league team players
English rugby league players
Leeds Rhinos players
People from Bramley, Leeds
Rugby league five-eighths
Rugby league halfbacks
Rugby league players from Leeds
Wigan Warriors players